The Battle of Alaboi was a battle fought between the Ahom Kingdom and the Mughal Empire around 5 August 1669. The result was a Mughal victory, but Ram Singh I's next move to open negotiations for peace. The Assamese also were tired of war, and hostilities were suspended for a time. Soon after the battle of Alaboi, Chakradhwaj Singha died in 1669. He was succeeded by his brother Udayaditya Singha.  This was part of the seizure of Guwahati that led up to the final Battle of Saraighat which the Ahoms won.

Challenge

Ram Singh I is said to have challenged Chakradhwaj Singha to a single combat and undertook in case of his defeat to return with his army to Bengal. The Assamese king, in his turn, grew impatient and ordered his commanders to attack the Mughals immediately and threatened them that, in the event of their failure, their hearts would be ripped open with axes.

Battle 
The Mughals concentrated their army near Alaboi hills in the vicinity of Dalbari. There was a vast plain in front of the Mughal camp, extending from the Brahmaputra to the Sessa river on the other. Lachit Borphukan wanted to avoid an open encounter with the superior Rajput cavalry, but the king ordered him to proceed. Ram Singh I despatched a force under Mir Nawab, and the Borphukan sent an army of forty thousand men. The Buranjis narrate that a female warrior named Madanvati at the vanguard of the Mughal army, rushed into the enemy lines with the speed of lightning, killing many soldiers with her sword, until she was shot dead by the Assamese soldiers. Persian sources do not mention it, possibly because Madanvati may have been a man disguised as a woman to demoralise the Assamese army. When the fight continued undecided, Ram Singh I ordered his lieutenants to engage the Assamese while retiring to the forts with spoils and captives. The Rajput soldiers were equipped with Yantras, machines with long shields, so that they could fight uninjured. The Assamese army was not prepared for the Mughal weapons and cavalry. As a result, the Assamese army lost ten thousand of their brave men.

Aftermath
Ram Singh I on receiving the first taste of decisive victory, cried out,- Look at the rashness of the Assamese! They venture to fight in the plains against the Amber horsemen! He requested the Borphukan to desist from provoking the Rajput cavalry in future. The Borphukan  wrote back to Ram Singh describing the Alaboi attack as an unauthorised diversion on the borders, chieftains who joined the Assamese army on the order of the king. A detachment has been lost, wrote Lachit Borphukan, and we are many more prepared for action. However the disaster disturbed Lachit Borphukan. Each of our soldier is a pillar of our strength, said the Borphukan and we have lost to-day ten thousand such stalwarts. The  Atan Buragohain gave him counsel saying- Well general, such a reverse should not take your confidence in our ultimate victory Eventualities of this character are common in protracted warfare. When you agitate the waters of a pond for catching large fishes the fish-catchers will be pricked by the thorny scales of smaller fry. You should judge your success by the number of large catches. Ram Singh now thought that the disaster of Alaboi had humbled the spirit of the Assamese, and he repeated his demand for the evacuation of Guwahati, Ram Singha tried to bribe the Phukans and the Rajkhowas, Ram Singh even sent a necklace studded with gems as a present to the Borphukan, but failed to achieve his intended result.

Notes

References

 Baruah, S L (1986), A Comprehensive History of Assam, Munshiram Manoharlal,
 Bhuyan, S.K. (1947). Lachit Barphukan and his times

See also
 Ahom Dynasty
 Ahom kingdom
 Ahom–Mughal conflicts
 Battle of Saraighat

History of Assam
History of Guwahati
17th-century conflicts
17th century in the Ahom kingdom
Wars involving the Mughal Empire
17th century in the Mughal Empire
Ahom kingdom
Military history of India